This is a list of notable fashion magazines.

See also
Fashion journalism

References

Fashion
Magazines